Rapto is a 2019 Peruvian-Argentine mystery thriller film directed by Frank Pérez-Garland and written by Alberto Rojas Apel and Vanessa Saba. It stars Stefano Salvini. It premiered on March 7, 2019, in Peruvian theaters.

Synopsis 
Sebastian Freyre, an outstanding law student in his last year and belonging to a wealthy Lima family, desperately seeks to find the whereabouts of his kidnapped grandfather. Along with Espinoza, his friend, and teacher, they begin a fight against time to find their grandfather before the four days that the kidnappers have given as the deadline. Along the way, secrets and revelations will come out that his family would never have wanted him to know.

Cast 
The actors participating in this film are:

 Stefano Salvini as Sebastián Freyre
 Osmar Núñez as Espinoza
 Alejandro Holguín as Martín
 Gustavo Bueno as Grandfather
 Sandro Calderón as Dad Martin
 Iván Chávez as Torres
 Giovanni Ciccia as Cárdenas
 Martha Figueroa as Grandmother
 Julia Thays as Mom Martin
 Maria Fernanda Valera as Eve
 Alicia Mercado as Teacher Girlfriend

Production 
In November 2015, it was announced that Frank Perez-Garland would work with his wife Vanessa Saba in a new production titled El secuestro (The kidnapping) which they later changed to Rapto (Rapture). The film was financially supported after being one of the winning productions in the Ibermedia 2015 contest.

Reception 
Rapto drew fewer than 20,000 viewers in its first week in theaters.

References

External links 

 

2019 films
2019 crime films
2019 thriller films
Peruvian mystery films
Peruvian crime films
Peruvian thriller films
Argentine mystery thriller films
Argentine crime thriller films
2010s Spanish-language films
2010s Peruvian films
2010s Argentine films
Films set in Peru
Films shot in Peru
Films about kidnapping